Meg Webster (born 1944) is an American artist from San Francisco working primarily in sculpture and installation art. While her works span multiple media, she is most well known for her artworks that feature natural elements. She is closely affiliated with Post-Minimalism and the Land Art movement and has been exhibiting her work since 1980. 

Her work is featured in many permanent collections throughout the world, including The Panza Collection at the Solomon R. Guggenheim Museum and the Walker Art Center. She has also created public, site-specific works for the Hudson River Park, Stanford University and other sites around the world.

Early life and education 
Meg Webster was born in San Francisco in 1944. She received her Bachelor of Fine Arts from Old Dominion University in Norfolk, Virginia. After shifting her focus from painting to sculpture, Webster pursued a Master of Arts degree at Yale University, completed in the early 1980s. While attending Yale, Webster was taught by important contemporary artists, such as Vito Acconci, Donald Judd, and Richard Serra. Webster has lived in the East Village in New York City since 1979, where she continues to produce sculptural works.

Work 
Meg Webster began exhibiting her work in 1980, showing her work in venues throughout the country. She draws inspiration from artists working in the vein of Land Art, such as Robert Smithson and Michael Heizer, her former mentor. Webster started working as Heizer's assistant in 1983, facilitating the installation of his exhibitions, including his 1985 solo show at the Whitney Museum. Meg Webster's most notable works are sculptures of natural materials, molded to create simple forms. Webster builds these works methodically and delicately, paying close attention to the structure and the weight of each work's physical presence.

Webster often employs industrial materials in her work juxtaposed with natural elements to create a visually complex space that provokes further thought on the intersection of nature and technology. Her artworks also often raise issues of global warming and the consequences of human interference with the environment. Although she is most recognized for her work in sculpture and installation, Webster also creates paintings and works on paper, both of which have been exhibited at Paula Cooper Gallery, her New York gallery representative. Webster continues to be featured in both group and solo shows in museums and galleries, in addition to her outdoor public commissions and garden designs.

She also did some notable works with Kurt Baptista an abstract artist in art show germany munich 2003

Installation art 

Meg Webster's immersive installations allow the viewer to fully experience her manufactured atmospheres and to inhibit her creative vision. In Pool, originally built in 1998 and later recreated in 2013, Webster inserted a pool into the exhibition space at MoMA PS1. Although the pool is entirely artificial, Webster decided not to hide the manmade mechanics that made the pool possible. The infusion of natural elements in an industrial space envelops the viewer and transports them into an entirely new venue where these two worlds coexist. The 2013 installation was a part of the exhibition Expo 1, which served as an artistic commentary on the role of environment in society, a question that Meg Webster often grapples with in her sculptures and installations.

Exhibited both in and out of doors, many of her works are site specific and are built in accordance with their physical surroundings. Webster directly engages with her environment and invites viewers to do the same. In her most recent solo show at Paula Cooper Gallery in New York, Webster created an installation work, Solar Grow Room, in which she built an indoor garden complete with reflective paneling and industrial lamps.

Sculpture 

Maintaining her preference for large scale works, Webster's sculptures are as dramatic and monumental as her installations. Although her sculptures generally pertain to environmental themes and incorporate natural materials, her pieces are sometimes composed of controlled geometric forms. Webster often turns to a certain roster of forms – cones, gates, hollows, beds, and rings – when creating her sculptures. Stick Spiral, created for the Panza Collection and later bequeathed to the Guggenheim Museum, consists of a simple spiral shape created solely from branches. The clean geometry is interrupted by the chaotic arrangement of branches, yet the piece remains contemplative rather than aggressive. Untitled (1990), part of the Western Washington University Public Sculpture Collection, consists of a low-lying copper planter with Cloudberry slowly descending in a conical shape back into the earth, combining minimalist vocabulary with an ecological concern.

In 2008, Meg Webster exhibited a selection of her smaller sculptures at Paula Cooper Gallery in New York City. One of the most remarkable pieces was “Melted Weapon Box,” a seemingly unassuming small metal box atop a white column. Next to the open box was a photograph of a life-size M-4 assault rifle, the original material for the box. Webster melted the weapon down to create the small cube; the presentation of the box itself does not seem an atypical choice for her, but the relation to a vehicle of violence is unique to her body of work.

Other media 

In addition to her work in installation and sculpture, Webster creates and exhibits what can be considered “paintings,” which consist of unconventional materials applied to paper. She chooses materials that are both industrial and natural, including cement, pollen and egg yolk. This combination of natural and manmade remains intrinsic to her work across each of her chosen media.

Webster has also experimented with video art in her various gallery shows. On multiple occasions, Webster has exhibited video projections of bears in their natural habitat, implying the consequences of malignant human intervention in the environment. Through these videos, Webster places environmental protection into dialogue with the commercial gallery space, asking the viewer to empathize with nature in an unexpected setting.

Exhibitions

Solo exhibitions 

 2020
Ann Mosseri-Marlio Galerie, Basel, Switzerland
2017
Volume for Lying Flat, Meg Webster, Hiram Butler Gallery, Houston, Texas
 2016
 Meg Webster, Paula Cooper Gallery, New York, New York
 2013  
 Meg Webster, Anne Mosseri-Marlio Galerie, Basel, Switzerland    
 Meg Webster: Pool, Expo 1: New York at MoMA PS1, Long Island City, New York    
 Meg Webster, Paula Cooper Gallery, New York, New York    
 2010
 New Drawings, Devin Borden Hiram Butler Gallery, Houston, Texas    
 Drawings, Paula Cooper Gallery, New York, New York    
 Hudson River Park, New York, New York    
 2009
 Meg Webster, Drawing and Objects Arkansas Arts Center, Little Rock, Arkansas    
 2008
 Meg Webster, Paula Cooper Gallery, New York, New York    
 2000
New Work, Paula Cooper Gallery, New York, New York
 1998
 Pool, P.S. 1 Contemporary Arts Center, Long Island City, New York    
 Photographs, Thomas Healy Gallery, New York, New York
 1997
 Blue Sky, Morris-Healy Gallery, New York, New York
 1996
 Drawings, Hiram Butler Gallery, Houston, Texas    
 Drawings, Morris-Healy Gallery, New York, New York    
 1993
 Recent Sculptures, Grand Salon, New York, New York    
 1992
 Kitchen Garden, Contemporary Arts Museum, Houston, Texas    
 Running, Brooklyn Museum, Brooklyn, New York; Weatherspoon Arts Gallery, University of North Carolina, Greensboro, North Carolina        
 1991
 Stream, Carnegie Museum of Art, Pittsburgh, Pennsylvania    
 1990
 Milwaukee Art Museum, Milwaukee, Wisconsin    
 Barbara Gladstone Gallery, New York, New York    
 Meg Webster, Stuart Regen, Los Angeles, California  
 Drawing/Object, Scott Hanson Gallery, New York, New York      
 1988
 Barbara Gladstone Gallery, New York, New York    
 1987
 Meg Webster: Part II - Additions, Subtractions, Reformations, Forecast Gallery, Peekskill, New York, New York    
 1986
 Excerpts from Circuit, Art Galaxy, New York, New York
 Meg Webster, Forecast Gallery, Peekskill, New York        
 1983
 Two Walls, Donald Judd's Exhibition Space, New York, New York    
 1980
 Leavenworth Street, San Francisco, California

Group exhibitions 

2020 
Sculpture Milwaukee (June - October, 2020) Figures on the Ground: Perspectives on Minimal Art, CAB Foundation, Brussels, Belgium (4/1/6/20/20)
2019
Non-Vicious Circle, Paula Cooper Gallery, New York, NY
Occupy Colby: Artists Need to Create On The Same Scale That Society Has The Capacity To Destroy, Year 2, Colby College, Waterville, Maine (7/20 - 12/31/19)
2018
Indicators: Artists On Climate Change, Storm King Art Center, New Windsor, NY (5/19 - 11/11/18)
2017
Artists Need to Create at the Same Scale that Society has the Capacity to Destroy, curated by Phong Bui, Mana Contemporary, Jersey City, NJ (10/15—12/15/17)
2016
Landmark, Socrates Sculpture Park, Long Island City, New York
2015
Natura Naturans Roxy Paine e Meg Webster, Villa e Collezione Panza, Varese, Italy    
2014
Art of Its Own Making, Pulitzer Arts Foundation, St. Louis, MO 
2013
Dojima River Biennale, Osaka, Japan 
2010
A Shot in the Dark, Walker Art Center, Minneapolis, Minnesota    
2009
Commentary, Paula Cooper Gallery, New York, New York    
2005
Down the Garden Path: The Artist’s Garden After Modernism, Queens Museum of Art, Queens, New York 
2000
Systems Order Nature, Devin Borden Hiram Butler Gallery, Houston, Texas 
Drawings & Photographs, Matthew Marks Gallery, New York, NY    
1999
Hiriya Project Proposals Exhibition, Tel Aviv Museum of Art, Israel    
1997
Around, Barbara Kraków Gallery, Boston, Massachusetts    
1996
On / In / Through, Morris-Healy Gallery, New York, New York    
1995
The Material Imagination, Solomon R. Guggenheim Museum, New York, New York    
1994
Urban Paradise: Gardens in the City, Public Art Fund, PaineWebber Gallery, New York, New York
1993
Dialogues with Nature, The Phillips Collection, Washington, D.C.
1992
Theoretically Yours, Chiesa di San Lorenzo, Acosta, Italy
1990
The Last Decade: American Artists of the 1980’s, Tony Shafrazi Gallery, New York  
Liz Larner, Rosemarie Trockel, Meg Webster, Stuart Regen Gallery, Los Angeles, California    
Botanica: The Secret Life of Plants, Lehman College Art Gallery, Bronx, New York    
1989
1989 Biennial Exhibition, Whitney Museum of American Art, New York, New York   
The Experience of Landscape: Three Decades of Sculpture, Whitney Museum of American Art, Downtown at Federal Reserve Plaza, New York, New York
Clegg & Guttmann, Andreas Gursky, Meg Webster, 303 Gallery, New York, New York     
Pre-Pop Post-Appropriation, Stux Gallery, New York, New York    
1988
Aperto 88, Venice Biennale, Venice, Italy    
Sculpture Inside Outside, Walker Art Center, Minneapolis, Minnesota; Museum of Fine Arts, Houston, Texas    
Art at the End of the Social, Rooseum, Malmö, Sweden    
Utopia Post Utopia, Institute of Contemporary Art, Boston, Massachusetts    
A Deer Manger, A Dress Pattern, Farthest Sea Water, and a Signature, 303 Gallery, New York, New York    
Media Post Media, Scott Hanson Gallery, New York, New York 
1987
Changing Group Exhibition, Paula Cooper Gallery, New York, New York    
The New Poverty, John Gibson Gallery, New York, New York    
Kindred Spirits, Hillwood Art Gallery, Long Island University, C.W. Post Campus, Brookville, New York, New York    
1986
Robert Gober, Nancy Shaver, Alan Turner, Meg Webster, Cable Gallery, New York, New York    
Sculpture in Place, Borough of Manhattan Community College, The City University of New York, New York    
1984
Tom Bills/Hank de Ricco/Meg Webster: Outdoor Installations, Nassau County Museum of Fine Art, Roslyn Harbor, New York    
1980
From the Land: An Exhibition of Earth-Related Works by Northeastern Artists, Brattleboro Museum and Art Center, Brattleboro, Vermont

Site-specific commissions 

 2020
 Frieze New York (5/7 – 5/10/20) Stage design for Yeezy Season 8 at Espace Niemeyer for Paris Fashion Week

 2019
 Stage design for Mary, a Kanye West opera, presented at David Geffen Hall at Lincoln Center, New York (12/22/19)
 Environmental installation in collaboration with Kanye West, “Jesus is King” album and film Premiere, The Forum, Los Angeles (10/23/19)

References

American women sculptors
American women installation artists
American installation artists
1944 births
Living people
Land artists
20th-century American sculptors
20th-century American women artists
21st-century American sculptors
21st-century American women artists
Artists from San Francisco
Sculptors from California
Old Dominion University alumni
Yale University alumni